Kandanad West Diocese is one of the 30 dioceses of Malankara Orthodox Syrian Church

History
In 1876 Malankara Orthodox Church was divided as 7 Dioceses by Mulanthuruthy Synod. Among that seven, one diocese was Kandanad Diocese, at that time the parishes of Kandanad Diocese were spread across Kottayam, Idukki and Ernakulam District.
The first Metropolitan of this diocese was Paulose mar Ivanios (murimattathil bava), who later became First Catholicos of Malankara Orthodox Church, and belongs to Kolenchery St. Peter's and St. Paul's orthodox church.
Followed by him this diocese was governed by the following Metropolitans.               
Yuyakim Mar Ivanios
Augen Mar Thimothios
Paulose Mar Philoxenos
Joseph Mar Pachomiose

From 1991 this diocese is under the auspicious leadership of Mathews Mar Severios. In 2002 this Diocese divided into Two Kandanad (E) and Kandanad (W).

Today
Today including parish churches and catholicate  centers there are 41 worship centers in this diocese. There are 40 priests including corepiscopas  offering their dedicated services in this Diocese.
The diocesan headquarters is now situated at Prasadam centre, kolenchery.
All spiritual organisations are very active in this diocese. Besides the spiritual activities, several charitable activities are also functioning under this diocese by the leadership of Mathews Mar Severios. The charitable institutions are organized and administered by Mar Pachomios charitable society and Pratheebha charitable trust.

Diocesan metropolitan
 Paulose Mar Ivanios
 Yuyakim Mar Ivanios
 Augen Mar Thimothios
 Paulose Mar Philoxenos
 Joseph Mar Pachomiose
 Mathews Mar Severios.

Social welfare projects
The Kandanad West Diocese has initiated several charitable projects.

Pratheeksha Bhavan

Located at Karimpana, Koothattukulam, Pratheekha Bhavan (The House of Hope) is the rehabilitation home for 50 orphan women who are mentally and physically challenged.

Prasanthi Bhavan

Prasanthi Bhavan (The House of Comfort) is designed to provide comfort to terminally ill patients who have no place to go. Situated at Kadayiruppu, this institution aims at providing service facilities for eighty poor patients who need long term treatment and protection.

Prathyasa Bhavan

Prathyasa Bhavn (The House of Expectation) taking care of 50 orphan boys who are mentally and physically challenged. Prathyasa Bhavan is located at South Piramadaom, Pampakkuda.

Prathibha Bhavan

Prathibha Bhavan is a job orientation centre for unemployed located at Kunnackal, Muvattupuzha. The project aims at training unemployed youths for self-employment through various small scale industries. Income from the sale of products are utilised for the expenses of charitable projects of the diocese. Products of the project are Prathibha Curry Powder, Prathibha Garments, Prathibha Candles, Prathibha Umbrellas and Prathibha Soaps.

Pradhanam

Helping poor patients by donating medicines.

Promodam

Promodam (Make people Happy) is a free food service which aims at distributing daily free lunch to inpatients in 11 government hospitals at Piravam, Muvattupuzha, Koothattukulam, Vadavucode, Kadayiruppu, Valakam, Ramamanagalam, Pampakkuda, Thodupuzha, Mulanthuruthy and Pandappilly.

Parishes
 St.Marys Orthodox Church, Attinkunnu
 St.Thomas Orthodox Church, Nechoor
 St. Marys Orthodox valiyapally, Onakkoor
 St. George Orthodox Church, Edamaruku
 St. George Orthodox Church, Kadamattom
 St. Mary's Orthodox Church, Kandanad
 St. George Orthodox Church, Kizhumuri
 St. Peter's and St. Paul's Orthodox Church, Kolenchery
 St. George Orthodox Church, Kottor
 St Peter's and St Paul's Parel Orthodox Church, Mulakkulam
 St. George Orthodox Church, Kunnackal West
 St. George Sehion Orthodox Church, Kunnackal East
 Mar Augen Orthodox Church, Maravanthuruthu
 St. George Orthodox Church, Moolamattom
 St. George Orthodox Church, Karmelkkunnu
 [http://mannookkunnucathedral.com/ 
St. Mary's Orthodox Cathedral, Mulakulam
 St.Marys Orthodox Church, Muttom
 St. John's Orthodox Valiya Pally, Pampakkuda
 St. Thomas Orthodox Cheriya Pally, Pampakkuda
 St. George Orthodox Church, Perumbadavom
 St. John's Orthodox Church, Peruva***
 St. Mary's Orthodox Church, Peruva
Mar Yoohanon Ihidoyo Orthodox Valiyapalli Mulakkulam
 Mar Bahanan Orthodox Syrian Church, Thevanal, Vettickal, Mulanthuruthy
 St.Marys Orthodox Church, Ooramana
 St.John's Orthodox Church, Puthuvely
 St.Peters and St.Paul Orthodox Church, Puthencruez
 St.Marys Orthodox Church, Valamboor
 St.Thomas Orthodox Church, Valamboor North***
 St.Thomas Orthodox Dayara Church, Vettickal

See also
 Malankara Orthodox Syrian Church
 Baselios Mar Thoma Paulose II

Notes

External links
 Website of the Malankara Orthodox Church
 Indian Christianity - Kandanad West Diocese
 kandanadwest.org

Malankara Orthodox Syrian Church dioceses
2002 establishments in Kerala